Jack Gilding (born 10 March 1988) is a rugby union player for London Welsh.

He hails from Plymouth and attended St Boniface's Catholic College, but qualifies to play for the Scotland national rugby union team through his Scottish Grandmother.

He plays as a tighthead prop. He previously played for Worcester Warriors.

External links
Worcester Warriors profile

1988 births
Living people
Rugby union players from Plymouth, Devon
Rugby Viadana players
Worcester Warriors players
English expatriate rugby union players
Expatriate rugby union players in Italy
Edinburgh Rugby players
English expatriate sportspeople in Italy
Rugby union props